The Walter A. Brown Trophy was a trophy awarded to the National Basketball Association (NBA) (the Basketball Association of America (BAA) from 1946 to 1949) team who won the NBA Finals at the conclusion of each NBA season from 1949 to 1977.

Description
The trophy was originally referred to as the NBA Finals trophy, but was renamed in 1964 after Walter A. Brown, the original owner of the Boston Celtics who was instrumental in merging the BAA and the National Basketball League into the NBA in 1949. A new trophy design was created for the 1977 NBA Finals, although it retained the Walter A. Brown title. Unlike the original championship trophy, the new trophy was given permanently to the winning team and a new one was made every year. It was renamed the Larry O'Brien Championship Trophy in 1984 to honor former NBA commissioner Larry O'Brien.

History

The original trophy was awarded to the BAA/NBA champions from 1947 to 1977. The trophy was kept by the winning team for one year and given to the winning team of the following year's finals, unless the previous team won again, much like the NHL's Stanley Cup, which continues that tradition to this day.

Winners

The inaugural winners of the trophy were the Philadelphia Warriors, who defeated the Chicago Stags. From 1957 to 1969, the Celtics won the NBA Finals 11 out of 13 times, including eight consecutive wins. The final winners of the trophy were the Portland Trail Blazers, who defeated the Philadelphia 76ers in the 1977 NBA Finals.

By franchise

† = Defunct

References

National Basketball Association awards
National Basketball Association Finals
Sports trophies and awards
1947 introductions